Konyukhov (from конюх meaning groom) is a Russian masculine surname, its feminine counterpart is Konyukhova. It may refer to:
Fyodor Konyukhov (born 1951), Russian survivalist and traveller
18301 Konyukhov, a minor planet named after Fyodor
Yevgeni Konyukhov (born 1986), Russian football player

See also 
 Konyukhovo (disambiguation), rural localities named "Konyukhovo"

Occupational surnames
Russian-language surnames